Lilian Vera Rolfe,  (26 April 1914 – 5 February 1945) was an Allied secret agent in the Second World War.

Early life
Rolfe and her twin sister Helen Fedora Rolfe were the daughters of George Rolfe, a British chartered accountant working in Paris. Although she grew up in Paris, she and her sister came to England for summer school to learn English when they were about 7 and then again when they were 11, as they spoke French at home. When she was 17 Rolfe came down with rheumatic fever while visiting an English family. In 1930, the family moved to Brazil for "professional reasons" and Lilian and Helen "finished school" there. She worked for the Canadian Embassy but when the war started she changed to the British Embassy. She completed courses in first aid and Morse code.

Second World War
At the onset of the Second World War, Rolfe worked at the British Embassy in Rio de Janeiro before going to London, England in 1943 to join the Women's Auxiliary Air Force. Because of her fluency in the French language, she was recruited into the Special Operations Executive (SOE), where she was trained as a wireless operator.

On 5 April 1944, Rolfe was dropped near the city of Orléans in occupied France, where she was deployed to work with the "Historian" network run by George Wilkinson. Her job was to transmit Maquis and other important radio messages to London. Beyond her wireless duties, which included reporting on German troop movements and organising arms and supply drops, she actively participated in missions with members of the French Resistance against the German occupiers and was involved in a gun battle in the small town of Olivet just south of Orléans.

Following the D-Day landings, an increasingly aggressive manhunt by the Gestapo led to the arrest of Rolfe's superior officer. Nonetheless, Rolfe continued to work until her arrest at a transmitting house in Nargis on 31 July 1944. Transported to Fresnes Prison in Paris, she was interrogated repeatedly and tortured until August 1944, when she was shipped to Ravensbrück concentration camp. According to an admission made by a German officer after the war's end, she was so ill that she could not walk. On 5 February 1945, 30-year-old Rolfe was executed by the Germans and her body disposed of in the crematorium.

Three other female members of the SOE were also executed at Ravensbrück: Denise Bloch, Cecily Lefort, and Violette Szabo.

Honours
The name of Lilian Rolfe is engraved on the Runnymede Memorial in Surrey, England. The "Lilian Rolfe House" at the Vincennes Estate, Lambeth was dedicated to her memory. In her honour, the government of France posthumously awarded her the Croix de Guerre. In the town of Montargis in the Loiret département, where she had been active, a street was named for her alias: "Rue Claudie Rolfe". As one of the SOE agents who died for the liberation of France, she is listed on the "Roll of Honour" on the Valençay SOE Memorial in the town of Valençay, in the Indre departément of France. Like many female agents she was seconded into the First Aid Nursing Yeomanry (FANY) when she joined SOE. Thus she is also commemorated on the FANY memorial at St Paul's Church Knightsbridge in London. On 19 August 2021 a plaque was installed on the house Rolfe was born in (32 avenue Duquesne in the 7th arrondissement of Paris) due to the efforts of Barbara Cronk, a member of the Rolfe family.

In the 1958 film Carve Her Name with Pride, the character of Lilian Rolfe was played by Anne Leon.

Notes

Bibliography
 Squadron Leader Beryl E. Escott, Mission Improbable: A salute to the RAF women of SOE in wartime France, London, Patrick Stevens Limited, 1991.  
 Liane Jones, A Quiet Courage: Women Agents in the French Resistance, London, Transworld Publishers Ltd, 1990.  
 Marucs Binney, The Women Who Lived for Danger: The Women Agents of SOE in the Second World War, London, Hodder and Stoughton, 2002.  
 Sarah Helm, A Life in Secrets: The Story of Vera Atkins and the Lost Agents of SOE, London, Abacus, 2005 

1914 births
1945 deaths
Executed spies
Female wartime spies
World War II spies for the United Kingdom
Female resistance members of World War II
Spies who died in Nazi concentration camps
Recipients of the Croix de Guerre (France)
People who died in Ravensbrück concentration camp
Women's Auxiliary Air Force officers
Women's Auxiliary Air Force airwomen
Resistance members killed by Nazi Germany
Royal Air Force personnel killed in World War II
Military personnel from Paris
French people executed in Nazi concentration camps
Executed people from Île-de-France
Female recipients of the Croix de Guerre (France)
Members of the Order of the British Empire
French Special Operations Executive personnel
British Special Operations Executive personnel
French women in World War II
Special Operations Executive personnel killed in World War II